South Orange Village Hall is located in South Orange, Essex County, New Jersey, United States. The building was designed by Rossiter & Wright and built in 1894. The building was added to the New Jersey Register of Historic Places on December 8, 1975 and was added to the National Register of Historic Places on May 28, 1976.

See also
National Register of Historic Places listings in Essex County, New Jersey

References

Government buildings completed in 1894
South Orange, New Jersey
Towers in New Jersey
Buildings and structures in Essex County, New Jersey
Village halls in the United States
Clock towers in New Jersey
National Register of Historic Places in Essex County, New Jersey
New Jersey Register of Historic Places
City and town halls in New Jersey
City and town halls on the National Register of Historic Places in New Jersey